is a Japanese actor who is affiliated with Box Corporation. He is best known for his role as the character, Shunpei Nara, from the Kamen Rider series Kamen Rider Wizard.

Biography
Tozuka graduated from Morioka Central High School. At the 23rd Junon Super Boy Contest, which was held in 2010, he won the "Ideal Lover Award", and went into the entertainment industry.

In May 2011, Tozuka appeared on Gekiotoko JB raising an army performances and formed in 12 people of the same contest synchronization finalists, the same year in July he debuted in the television drama Hanazakari no Kimitachi e.

In September 2012, he appeared in Kamen Rider Wizard as Shunpei Nara.

In 2013, Tozuka starred in the film Kazekiribane 〜 Ka zakiriba 〜 with Mika Akizuki.

Filmography

TV series

Films

References

External links
 Official profile at Box Corporation

1992 births
Living people
21st-century Japanese male actors
People from Iwate Prefecture